Poorly differentiated thyroid carcinoma  is malignant neoplasm of follicular cell origin showing intermediate histopathological patterns between differentiated and undifferentiated thyroid cancers.

Histopathology
Presence of small cells with round nuclei and scant cytoplasm with a diffuse solid pattern
Round or oval nests (insulae) or in trabeculae. 
Solid growth and presence of microfollicles, some of which contain dense colloid.
Extrathyroidal extension and blood vessel invasion 
Foci of necrosis, 
 Larger than 5 cm in greatest diameter at diagnosis

Epidemiology
PDTC affects predominantly females about 55 years of age

References

External links 

Thyroid cancer